Bilyanska  is a village in Smolyan Municipality, located in the Smolyan Province of southern Bulgaria. The village is located 174.093 km from Sofia. As of 2007, the village had a population of 29 people.

References

Villages in Smolyan Province